Ilene is a given name. Notable people with the name include:

Ilene Beckerman (born 1935), American writer
Ilene Berns (1943–2017), a record company director from Cleveland, Ohio
Ilene Chaiken (born 1957), television producer and writer
Ilene Graff (born 1949), American actress and singer
Ilene Hamann (born 1984), Indian actress and model
Ilene Kristen (born 1952), American actress
Ilene Strizver (born 1953), noted typographic educator, author, designer; founder of The Type Studio in Westport, Connecticut
Ilene Woods (1929–2010), American singer and actress

See also
Eileen, a given name
Ilene, Indiana, unincorporated community in Washington Township, Greene County, Indiana
Ilene Markham, reoccurring fictional character on the TV series Home Improvement (TV series)

Feminine given names